{{DISPLAYTITLE:Perkwunos}}

 (Proto-Indo-European: , 'the Striker' or 'the Lord of Oaks') is the reconstructed name of the weather god in Proto-Indo-European mythology. The deity was connected with fructifying rains, and his name was probably invoked in times of drought. In a widespread Indo-European myth, the thunder-deity fights a multi-headed water-serpent during an epic battle in order to release torrents of water that had previously been pent up. The name of his weapon, which denoted both "lightning" and "hammer", can be reconstructed from the attested traditions.

Perkwunos was often associated with oaks, probably because such tall trees are frequently struck by lightning, and his realm was located in the wooded mountains, . A term for the sky, apparently denoted a "heavenly vault of stone", but also "thunderbolt" or "stone-made weapon", in which case it was sometimes also used to refer to the thunder-god's weapon.

The linguistic evidence for the worship of a thunder god under the name  as far back as Proto-Indo-European times (4500–2500 BC) is therefore less secured.

Name

Etymology 
The name  is generally regarded as stemming from the Proto-Indo-European (PIE) verbal root  ('to strike'). An alternative etymology is the PIE noun  ('the oak'), attached to the divine nomenclature  ('master of').

The theonym  thus either meant "the Striker" or "the Lord of Oaks". A theory uniting those two etymologies has been proposed in the mythological association of oaks with thunder, suggested by the frequency with which such tall trees are struck by lightning.

The existence of a female consort is suggested by gendered doublet-forms such as found in South Slavic , Old Norse , and Lithuanian .

Epithets 
Other Indo-European theonyms related to 'thunder', through another root , are found in the Germanic  (Thor), the Celtic  (from an earlier ), and the Latin epithet  (attached to Jupiter).

Depiction

Weapon 
 is usually depicted as holding a weapon, named  in the Baltic and Old Norse traditions, which personifies lightning and is generally conceived as a club, mace, or hammer made of stone or metal. In the Latvian poetic expression  ("Pērkōn throws his mace"), the mace, is cognate with the Old Norse , the hammer thrown by the thunder god Thor, and also with the word for 'lightning' in the Old Prussian , the Old Church Slavonic , or the Welsh .

Fructifying rains 
While his thunder and lightning had a destructive connotation, they could also be seen as a regenerative force since they were often accompanied by fructifying rains. The Balkan Slavs worshipped Perun along with his female counterpart , the name of a ritual prayer calling for fructifying rains and centred on the dance of a naked virgin who had not yet had her first monthly period.

 is especially invoked by Albanians in incantations and songs praying for rain. Rituals were performed in times of summer drought to make it rain, usually in June and July, but sometimes also in the spring months when there was severe drought. In different Albanian regions, for rainmaking purposes, people threw water upwards to make it subsequently fall to the ground in the form of rain. This was an imitative type of magic practice with ritual songs.

A mythical multi-headed water-serpent is connected with the thunder-deity in an epic battle. The monstrous foe is a "blocker of waters", and his heads are eventually smashed by the thunder-deity to release the pent-up torrents of rain.

Striker and god of oaks 
In the Albanian language, a word to refer to the lightning—considered in folk beliefs as the "fire of the sky"—is shkreptimë, a formation of shkrep meaning "to flash, tone, to strike (till sparks fly off)". An association between strike, stones and fire, can be related to the observation that one can kindle fire by striking stones against each other. The act of producing fire through a strike—reflected also in the belief that fire is residual within the oak trees after the thunder-god strikes them—indicates the potential of lightning in the myth of creation.
The Slavic thunder-god Perūn is said to frequently strike oaks to put fire within them, and the Norse thunder-god Thor to strike his foes the giants when they hide under an oak. According to Belarusian folklore, Piarun made the first fire ever by striking a tree in which the Demon was hiding.

In Lithuanian and Latvian folkloric material, / is invoked to protect against snakes and illness.

Wooded mountains 
 is often portrayed in connection with stone and (wooded) mountains; mountainous forests were considered to be his realm. A cognate relationship has been noted between the Germanic  ('[mountainous] forest') and the Gaulish  ('[oaks] forests'). The Old Russian chronicles describe wooden idols of Perūn on hills overlooking Kyiv and Novgorod, and both the Belarusian Piarun and the Lithuanian Perkūnas were said to dwell on lofty mountaintops. Prince Vladimir the Great had an idol of  cast down into the Dnepr river during the Christianization of Kievan Rus'.

Pagans believed that Perkūnas would freeze if Christians extinguished those fires.

Words from a stem  are also attested in the Hittite  ('rock, cliff, boulder'), the Avestan  ('mountains'), as well as in the Sanskrit goddess  and the epithet  ('lord of mountains'), attached to her father .

Stony skies 
A term for the sky, denoted both 'stone' and 'heaven', possibly a 'heavenly vault of stone' akin to the biblical firmament. The motif of the stony skies can be found in the story of the Greek Akmon ('anvil'), the father of Ouranos and the personified Heaven. The term  was also used with the meaning  'thunderbolt' in Homeric and Hesiodic diction.

Albanians believed in the supreme powers of thunder-stones (kokrra e rrufesë or guri i rejës), which were believed to be formed during lightning strikes and to be fallen from the sky. Thunder-stones were preserved in family life as important cult objects. It was believed that bringing them inside the house could bring good fortune, prosperity and progress in people, in livestock and in agriculture, or that rifle bullets would not hit the owners of the thunder-stones. A common practice was to hang a thunder-stone pendant on the body of the cattle or on the pregnant woman for good luck and to counteract the evil eye.

The mythological association can be explained by the observation (e.g., meteorites) or the belief that thunderstones (polished ones for axes in particular) had fallen from the sky. Indeed, the Vedic word  is the name of the weapon thrown by Indra, Thor's weapon is also called , and the thunder-stone can be named  ('Perkuna's stone') in the Lithuanian tradition. The original meaning of  could thus have been 'stone-made weapon', then 'sky' or 'lightning'.

Evidence

Theonyms 

PIE: *per-, 'to strike' (or *pérkʷus, the 'oak'),
PIE: *per-kwun-os, the weather god,
Baltic:
Old Prussian: Perkunis,
Yotvingian: Parkuns (or Parcuns),
Latgalian: Pārkiuņs (ltg);
Lithuanian: Perkūnas, the god of rain and thunder, depicted as an angry-looking man with a tawny beard,
Latvian: Pērkōns, whose functions are occasionally merged with those of Dievs (the sky-god) in the Latvian dainas (folk songs),
Percunatele or Perkunatele, a female deity associated with Perkunas, as mother or wife;
 PIE: *per-uh₁n-os, the 'one with the thunder stone',
Slavic: *perunъ 
Old Church Slavonic: Perūn (Перýн), the 'maker of the lightning',
Old Russian: Perunŭ, Belarusian: Piarun (Пярун), Czech: Peraun,
Slovak: Perún ; Parom; 
Bulgarian: Perun;
Polish: Piorun ("lightning");
Russian: Peryn, a peninsula in Novgorod, Russia, connected to a historical worship of Slavic Perun.
South Slavic: Perun and Perperuna, a reduplicated feminine derivative from Perun's name which parallels the Old Norse couple Fjörgyn–Fjörgynn and the Lithuanian Perkūnas–Perkūnija,
PIE: *per-kwun-iyo (feminine *per-kwun-iyā, the 'realm of Perkwunos', i.e. the [wooded] mountains),
Celtic: ,
Gaulish: the Hercynian (Hercynia) forest or mountains, ancient name of the Ardennes and the Black Forest, which was also known as Arkunia by the time of Aristotle;  Hercuniates (’Ερκουνιατες; attached to the suffix -atis 'belonging to'), the name of a Celtic tribe from Pannonia, as described by Pliny and Ptolemy.
Germanic: *fergunja, meaning 'mountain', perhaps 'mountainous forest' (or the feminine equivalent of *ferga, 'god'),
Old Norse: Fjörgyn, the mother of the thunder-god Thor, the goddess of the wooded landscape and a poetic synonym for 'land' or 'the earth',
Old High German: Firgunnea, the Ore Mountains, and Virgundia Waldus, Virgunnia, 'oaks forest',
Slavic: , 'wooded hills' (perhaps an early borrowing from Germanic),
Old Church Slavonic: , Old Russian: peregynja, 'wooded hills'; Polish:  (toponym),

Thunder-god's weapon 
The name of Perkwunos' weapon *meld-n- is attested by a group of cognates alternatively denoting 'hammer' or 'lightning' in the following traditions:

PIE: , 'to grind',
Northern PIE: *mel-d-(n)-, 'thunder-god's hammer > lightning',
Germanic: *melðunijaz,
Old Norse: mjǫllnir, the hammer of Thor; cf. also myln, 'fire',
Balto-Slavic: *mild-n-,
Slavic: *mlъldni,
Old Church Slavonic: mlъni or mlъnii, Serbo-Croatian: múnja (муња), Slovene mółnja, Bulgarian: , Macedonian: молња, 'lightning',
Russian: mólnija (молния), 'lightning', Ukrainian maladnjá (dial.) 'lightning without thunder', Belarusian: маланка, 'lightning',
Czech:  (arch.), Polish  (dial.), Lusatian: milina (arch.) 'lightning' (modern 'electricity'),
Baltic: *mildnā,
Old Prussian: , 'lightning bolt',
Latvian: milna, the 'hammer of the Thunderer', Pērkōns,
Celtic: *meldo-, 
Gaulish: Meldos, an epithet of thunder divinity Loucetios; as well as Meldi (*Meldoi), a tribal name, and Meldio, a personal name.
Welsh: , 'lightning, thunderbolts' (sing. , 'bolt of lightning'), and Mabon am Melld or Mabon fab Mellt ('Mabon son of Mellt'),
Breton: mell, 'hammer',
Armenian: մուրճ (mowrtch), 'hammer'.
Another PIE term derived from the verbal root  ('to grind'),  ('grinding device'), also served as a common word for 'hammer', as in Old Church Slavonic mlatъ, Latin malleus, and Hittite malatt ('sledgehammer, bludgeon').

19th-century scholar Francis Hindes Groome cited the existence of the "Gypsy" (Romani) word malúna as a loanword from Slavic molnija. The Komi word molńi or molńij ('lightning') has also been borrowed from Slavic.

Heavenly vault of stone 

 PIE: *h₂eḱ-, 'sharp',
PIE: *h₂éḱmōn (gen. *h₂ḱmnós; loc. *h₂ḱméni), 'stone, stone-made weapon' > 'heavenly vault of stone',
 Indo-Aryan: *Haćman, 
 Vedic: áśman, 'stone, sling-stone, thunderbolt',
 Avestan: asman, 'stone, sling-stone, heaven',
 Greek: ákmōn (ἄκμων), 'anvil, meteoric stone, thunderbolt, heaven',
Balto-Slavic: *akmen-,
 Lithuanian: akmuõ, 'stone',
 Latvian: akmens, 'stone',
Germanic: *hemō (gen.*hemnaz, dat. *hemeni), 'heaven',
Gothic: himins, 'heaven',
Old English: heofon, Old Frisian: himel, Old Saxon: heƀan, Old Dutch: himil, Old High German: himil, 'heaven',
Old Norse: himinn, 'heaven',

A metathesized stem *ḱ(e)h₂-m-(r)- can also be reconstructed from Slavic *kamy ('stone'), Germanic *hamaraz ('hammer'), and Greek kamára ('vault').

Other possible cognates 
Indo-Iranian:
Vedic: Parjanya, the god of rain, thunder and lightning (although Sanskrit sound laws rather predict a  form; an intermediate form *pergénio has therefore been postulated, possibly descending from *per-kwun-iyā).
Nuristani: Pärun (or Pērūneî), a war god worshipped in Kafiristan (present-day Nuristan Province, Afghanistan),
Persian: Piran (Viseh), a heroic figure present in the Shahnameh, the national epic of Greater Iran; it has been suggested his name might be related to the Slavic deity Perun,
Scythian: in the 19th century, Russian folklorist Alexander Afanasyev and French philologist Frédéric-Guillaume Bergmann (fr) mentioned the existence of a Scythian deity named Pirkunas or Pirchunas, an epithet attached to the "Scythian Divus" and meaning 'rainy'.
Celtic  ('oak'),
Hispano-Celtic: Erguena (ERGVENA), a personal name thought to mean 'oak-born' (*pérkʷu-genā) or to derive from *pérkʷu-niya 'wooded mountain'.
Celtiberian: berkunetakam ('Perkunetaka'), a word attested in the Botorrita Plate I and interpreted as a sacred oak grove,
Pyrenees: the theonym Expercennius, attested in an inscription found in Cathervielle and possibly referring to an oak god. His name might mean 'six oaks'.
Gaulish: ercos ('oak'),
Gallo-Roman: references to 'Deus Ercus' (in Aquitania), 'Nymphae Percernae' (Narbonensis), and a deity named 'Hercura' (or Erecura) which appears throughout the provinces of the Roman Empire. Patrizia de Bernardo Stempel argues that Aerecura/Hercura derives from a Celtic *perk(w)ura.
Irish: Erc (mac Cairpri), mentioned at the end of Táin Bó Cúailnge, and placed on the throne of Tara by Conchobar mac Nessa in Cath Ruis na Ríg for Bóinn; although an alternative etymology from PIE *perk- ('color') > *perk-no ('[spotted] fish') has been proposed by Hamp and Matasović.
Greek:  (κεραυνός), the name of Zeus’s thunderbolt, which was sometimes also deified (by metathesis of *; although the root *ḱerh₂-, 'shatter, smash' has also been proposed), and the Herkyna spring-nymph, associated with a river of the same name and identified with Demeter (the name could be a borrowing as it rather follows Celtic sound laws),
Italic:
Italian: porca, a word meaning 'fir tree' in the Trentino dialect. Mallory and Adams suppose it is a loanword from Raetic.
Slavic
Pomeranian: Porenut, latinized as Porenutius in the work of Saxo Grammaticus. The name is believed to refer to a deity worshipped in the port city of Rügen in ancient times as a possible son of Perun.
Romano-Germanic: inscriptions to the Matronae 'Ala-ferhuiae' found in Bonn, Altdorf, or Dormagen.
Paleo-Balkanic:
Illyrian: Perëndi, a sky and thunder god (from per-en-, an extension of PIE *per, 'to strike', attached to -di, the sky-god Dyēus, thus related to *per-uhₓn-os (see above); although the Albanian perëndoj, 'to set (of the sun)', from Latin parentare, 'a sacrifice (to the dead), to satisfy', has also been proposed as the origin of the deity,
Thracian: Perkos/Perkon (Περκος/Περκων), a horseman hero depicted as facing a tree surrounded by a snake. His name is also attested as Ήρω Περκω and Περκώνει "in Odessos and the vicinities".
Caucasus: it has been suggested that the characters Пиръон (Piryon) and Пиръа (Pirya) may attest the presence of the thunder god's name in the Caucasus.

Legacy 
Louis Léger stated that the Polabians adopted Perun as their name for Thursday (Perendan or Peräunedån), which is likely a calque of German Donnersdag.

Some scholars argue that the functions of the Luwian and Hittite weather gods Tarḫunz and Tarḫunna ultimately stem from those of Perkwunos. Anatolians may have dropped the old name in order to adopt the epithet *Tṛḫu-ent- ('conquering', from PIE *terh2-, 'to cross over, pass through, overcome'), which sounded closer to the name of the Hattian Storm-god Taru. According to scholarship, the name Tarhunt- is also cognate to the Vedic present participle tū́rvant- ('vanquishing, conquering'), an epithet of the weather-god Indra.

Toponyms 
Scholarship indicates the existence of a holdover of the theonym in European toponymy, specially in Eastern European and Slavic-speaking regions.

In the territory that encompasses the modern day city of Kaštela existed the ancient Dalmatian city of Salona. Near Salona, in Late Antiquity, there was a hill named Perun. Likewise, the ancient oronym Borun (monte Borun) has been interpreted as a deformation of the theonym Perun. Their possible connection is further reinforced by the proximity of a mountain named Dobrava, a widespread word in Slavic-speaking regions that means 'oak grove'.

Places in South-Slavic-speaking lands are considered to be reflexes of Slavic god Perun, such as Perunac, Perunovac, Perunika, Perunićka Glava, Peruni Vrh, Perunja Ves, Peruna Dubrava, Perunuša, Perušice, Perudina, and Perutovac. Scholar Marija Gimbutas cited the existence of the place names Perunowa gora (Poland), Perun Gora (Serbia), Gora Perun (Romania), and Porun hill (Istria). Patrice Lajoye associates place names in the Balkans with the Slavic god Perun: the city of Pernik and the mountain range Pirin (in Bulgaria), as well as a location named Përrenjas in South Albania. He also proposes that the German city of Pronstorf is also related to Perun, since it is located near Segeberg, whose former name was Perone in 1199.

The name of the Baltic deity Perkunas is also attested in Baltic toponyms and hydronyms: a village called Perkūniškės in Žemaitija, north-west of Kaunas, and the place name Perkunlauken ('Perkuns Fields') near modern Gusev.

See also

 Indo European Smith God

Footnotes

References

Bibliography

Zaroff, Roman. "Organized pagan cult in Kievan Rus: The invention of foreign elite or evolution of local tradition? [Organizirani poganski kult v kijevski drzavi: Iznajdba tuje elite ali razvoj krajevnega izrocila?]". In: Studia mythologica Slavica. 2 (1999): 56-60. 10.3986/sms.v2i0.1844.

Further reading
General studies
Blinkenberg, Christian. The Thunderweapon In Religion And Folklore: a Study In Comparative Archaeology. Cambridge [Eng.]: The University press, 1911.

 Laurinkiene, Nijole. Senovés Lietuviu Dievas Perkunas. Vilnius, Lithuania: Lietuvu Literaturos Tautosakos Institutas. 1996. 

For the etymology of the Indo-European weather-god, see
 

For the association with "stones", "mountains" and "heaven", see
 
 
 

Proto-Indo-European deities
Sky and weather gods
Thunder gods
Etymologies
Nature gods
Reconstructed words
Proto-Indo-European mythology